Cajamar is a municipality in the State of São Paulo, Brazil. It is part of the Metropolitan Region of São Paulo. The population is 77,934 (2020 est.) in an area of 131.39 km². It is bordered by Jundiaí to the north, Franco da Rocha and Caieiras to the east, the capital of the southeast, Santana do Parnaíba and Pirapora do Bom Jesus in the west.

It became a municipality in 1959, when emancipated from Santana do Parnaíba. In the district headquarters, in the city are also the districts of Jordanésia and Polvilho.
 Cajamar has become a center of logistics in Brazil, Prologis Recently opened Prologis Cajamar II 

Cajamar is located at an average altitude of 760 meters.

The climate of the city, and across the metropolitan area of São Paulo, is subtropical. The average annual temperature is around 20C°, with the coldest month July (average 15 °C) and warmest in February (average of 23 °C). The annual rainfall is around 1300 mm.

References

Municipalities in São Paulo (state)
Populated places established in 1959